Custer Park is an unincorporated community in Will County, Illinois, United States.

Demographics

References

Unincorporated communities in Illinois
Unincorporated communities in Will County, Illinois